Bjørhusdal Church is a parish church of the Church of Norway in Namsskogan municipality in Trøndelag county, Norway. It is one of the three churches for the Namsskogan parish which is part of the Namdal prosti (deanery) in the Diocese of Nidaros. The brown, wooden church was built in a long church style in 1970 using plans drawn up by the architect Arne Aursand. The church seats about 120 people and it serves the northern part of the municipality.

See also
List of churches in Nidaros

References

Namsskogan
Churches in Trøndelag
Wooden churches in Norway
20th-century Church of Norway church buildings
Churches completed in 1970
1970 establishments in Norway
Long churches in Norway